Sidney Alexander may refer to:
 Sidney S. Alexander (1916–2005), American economist
 Sidney A. Alexander (1866–1948), English poet, author, and clergyman